German submarine U-145 was a Type IID U-boat of Nazi Germany's Kriegsmarine during World War II. She was laid down on 29 March 1940 at Deutsche Werke in Kiel as yard number 274, launched on 21 September and commissioned under the command of Oberleutnant zur See Heinrich Driver.

Her service was carried out, first with the 1st U-boat Flotilla then the 22nd flotilla; she stayed with the latter organization for most of her career.

Design
German Type IID submarines were enlarged versions of the original Type IIs. U-145 had a displacement of  when at the surface and  while submerged. She had two shafts and two  propellers.

U-145 was fitted with three  torpedo tubes at the bow, five torpedoes or up to twelve Type A torpedo mines, and a  anti-aircraft gun. The boat had a complement of 25.

Operational career
U-145 did not sink or damage any ships, but she conducted three war patrols all in 1941.

References

Bibliography

External links

German Type II submarines
U-boats commissioned in 1940
World War II submarines of Germany
1940 ships
Ships built in Kiel
Operation Deadlight
U-boats sunk in 1945
Maritime incidents in December 1945